Hulk Comic (later The Incredible Hulk Weekly) was a black-and-white Marvel UK comics anthology published under the editorship of Dez Skinn starting in 1979.

Publication history
After starring for many years in the Marvel UK flagship title, The Mighty World of Marvel, the Hulk was given his own weekly publication. Explaining the thinking behind the comic Dez Skinn said: "I was wanting an adventure anthology title more than a super-hero one. Super-heroes had never been big sellers in the UK, we had plenty of legends of the past to spin fantasies about. So I went that route, picking existing Marvel characters who weren't really cut from the super-hero cloth."

Like many titles published by the company under Dez Skinn, Hulk Comic featured new material produced by British creators such as Steve Dillon, David Lloyd and Steve Parkhouse—along with a smattering of American reprints drawn from the Lee/Kirby Marvel back-catalogue. Once Skinn was replaced by Paul Neary, however, the title's original output dwindled, being supplanted by an increasing number of reprints, in part because creative resources were being redirected towards Doctor Who Weekly.

The title included new Hulk material drawn by Dave Gibbons and Steve Dillon. This material portrayed the inarticulate, wandering Hulk of the 1970s television series. Once the title began featuring American reprints, it featured the Marvel Universe Hulk as depicted by Sal Buscema.

Other original work included Nick Fury also drawn by Steve Dillon and a new Black Knight strip which also featured Captain Britain. These original stories were mostly restricted to the first 20 issues of the title, after which they were replaced by U.S. reprints due to low sales, with only the popular Black Knight strip running through most further issues until the title's cancellation. Hulk Comic launched the character Night Raven by Steve Parkhouse and David Lloyd. Night Raven is one of several Marvel UK characters who eventually made the jump to American comics.

The title lasted 63 issues before merging with Marvel UK's Spider-Man weekly title.

Original material
The following is a list of all the UK-originated strips in the title together with their respective issue numbers.

 The Incredible Hulk, #1-6, 9-20, 26-28
 The Black Knight, #1, 3-30, 42-55, 57-63
 Nick Fury, Agent of S.H.I.E.L.D., #1-19
 Night-Raven, #1-20
 Ant-Man, #48-49

Collected editions
Some of the original material has been collected into trade paperbacks:

 Night Raven: The Collected Stories (64 pages, Marvel Comics, October 1990)
 Captain Britain (Panini Comics):
 Volume 3: The Lion and the Spider (includes Hulk Comic Weekly #1, 3-30, 204 pages, November 2008)
 Volume 4: The Siege of Camelot (includes Hulk Comic Weekly #42-55, 57-63, 258 pages, November 2009)

Notes

References

External links
 Night Raven at the International Catalogue of Superheroes

Comics anthologies
1979 comics debuts
Hulk (comics) titles